Sir Robert Greenhill-Russell, 1st Baronet (1763 – 12 December 1836), born Robert Greenhill, was a British politician.

He was born in 1763 to the Rev. John Russell Greenhill and Elizabeth Noble. He was the grandson of Elizabeth Russell, who belonged to the Russell of Chequers Court family and were descended from Oliver Cromwell.

Robert changed his last name to Greenhill-Russell upon inheriting Chequers from his father in 1815. He was granted the title Baronet Greenhill-Russell of Chequers Court.

He served as Member of Parliament for Thirsk between 1806 and 1832.

Robert died in 1836 and the Greenhill-Russell Baronetcy became extinct, although Chequers passed into the hands of his kinsman Sir Robert Frankland-Russell, 7th Baronet. He was buried at Ellesborough, Bucks.

Footnotes

References
Lipscomb, History of Bucks, 1831

External links 
 

1763 births
1836 deaths
Baronets in the Baronetage of the United Kingdom
Members of the Parliament of the United Kingdom for English constituencies
Whig (British political party) MPs for English constituencies
UK MPs 1806–1807
UK MPs 1807–1812
UK MPs 1812–1818
UK MPs 1818–1820
UK MPs 1820–1826
UK MPs 1826–1830
UK MPs 1830–1831
UK MPs 1831–1832